Julie Brixie is a Democratic member of the Michigan House of Representatives.

Biography
Julie Brixie was born in Chicago, IL to two teachers. She received a B.S. in Physical Geography from the University of Illinois. During college, she met her husband, and the two moved to East Lansing, Michigan. There, she received her Master’s in crop and soil sciences with a specialization in environmental toxicology from Michigan State University. She then ran a mobile laboratory, conducting investigations and cleanups of contaminated sites in Michigan, and raised her children with her husband in mid-Michigan.

Public Service
Brixie served on the Meridian Township board for eighteen years. She has served two terms in the Michigan House of Representatives starting in 2018, and served on the Appropriations, Oversight, Administrative Rules, and Tax Policy committees. She is running for a third term in Michigan's newly re-drawn House of Representatives district 73 in 2022.

References

External links 
 Julie Brixie at housedems.com

21st-century American politicians
21st-century American women politicians
Democratic Party members of the Michigan House of Representatives
Living people
Women state legislators in Michigan
Year of birth missing (living people)